Sweet Sixteen is an original novel based on the U.S. television series Buffy the Vampire Slayer.

Plot summary

Buffy has a run-in with a couple demons at store while a gangly blonde girl watches on. Afterwards Buffy tries to talk to her but she runs off, faster than Buffy can catch her. Meanwhile Dawn has befriended a girl named Arianna at her school. Arianna has no friends and an abusive mother and has always longed to become a heroine. After it becomes clear that Arianna is the exceptionally strong girl that Buffy ran into, the gang tries to find out where Arianna's powers are coming from. Meanwhile, a demon called Aurek is searching for his daughter Arianna who is to become the Reaver, a being used for mass destruction of the dimensions. He finally locates her and tries to convince her that all humans are against demons. Just as Arianna starts to befriend Buffy, she then begins to pull away. Fearing that Buffy will just kill her in the end. Arianna has to make a decision on whether or not to keep her humanity.

Meta reference
 Dawn references Psycho Beach Party, a film featuring Nicholas Brendon, the actor who plays Xander Harris.

Continuity

Supposed to be set after "The Body".

Canonical issues

Buffy books such as this one are not usually considered by fans as canonical. Some fans consider them stories from the imaginations of authors and artists, while other fans consider them as taking place in an alternative fictional reality. However unlike fan fiction, overviews summarising their story, written early in the writing process, were 'approved' by both Fox and Joss Whedon (or his office), and the books were therefore later published as officially Buffy/Angel merchandise.

External links

Reviews
Litefoot1969.bravepages.com - Review of this book by Litefoot
Teen-books.com - Reviews of this book
Nika-summers.com - Review of this book by Nika Summers
Shadowcat.name - Review of this book
Slayerlit.us - Review of this book

2002 American novels
Books based on Buffy the Vampire Slayer
Novels by Scott Ciencin